The CERH Women's Euro 2011 or 2011 CERH Women's Championship was the 11th edition of the CERH European Women's Roller Hockey Championship. It was held between 25 and 29 October, in Cronenberg, Germany as a single round-robin stage. All games were played at Alfred Henckels Halle.

Defending champion Spain won its third title by winning all four games with a 21-4 goal average.

Results

Champion

Scorers
8 goals
  Natasha Lee

6 goals
  Marlene Sousa
  Beata Geismann
  Maren Wichardt

5 goals
  Vania Ribeiro
  Tatiana Malard

4 goals
  Anna Casarramona
  Berta Tarrida
  Vanessa Daribo

3 goals
  Rita Paulo
  Adeline Le Borgne

2 goals
  María Díez
  Marta Soler
  Ines Vieira
  Lea Reinert
  Emilie Couderc
  Christine Schneider
  Daniela Senn

1 goal
  Yolanda Font
  Laura La Rocca
  Sandra Drouhet
  Catia Almeida

References

External links
Official Website of Euro 2011 Cronemberg

Rink Hockey Euro 2010 Wuppertal Information
Comité Européen de Rink-Hockey CERH website

Roller Hockey European Championship
European Women's Roller Hockey Championship
European Championship
International roller hockey competitions hosted by Germany
Euro